Duel at Apache Wells (also known as Durango Kid der Rächer in Austrian and West German territories) is a 1957 American Western film in Naturama directed by Joseph Kane (credited as Joe Kane) for Republic Pictures. It was written by Robert Kreighton Williams (as Bob Williams) and stars Anna Maria Alberghetti, Ben Cooper and Jim Davis.

Plot
After years of absence, Johnny Shattuck (Ben Cooper) returns home, only to find a gang after his father's ranch and his girlfriend (Anna Maria Alberghetti).

Cast
 Anna Maria Alberghetti as Anita Valdez 
 Ben Cooper as Johnny Shattuck (a.k.a. "The Durango Kid")
  Jim Davis as Dean Cannary 
 Harry Shannon as Wayne Shattuck 
 Francis McDonald as Hank 
 Bob Steele as Joe Dunn
 Argentina Brunetti as Tia Maria

External links
 
 

Films directed by Joseph Kane
1957 films
1957 Western (genre) films
American black-and-white films
American Western (genre) films
1950s English-language films
1950s American films